In genetics, rs6311 is a gene variation—a single nucleotide polymorphism (SNP)—in the human HTR2A gene that codes for the 5-HT2A receptor. 5-HT2A is a neuroreceptor, and several scientific studies have investigated the effect of the genetic variation on personality, e.g., personality traits measured with the Temperament and Character Inventory
or with a psychological task measuring impulsive behavior.
The SNP has also been investigated in rheumatology studies.

Some research studies may refer to this gene variation as a C/T SNP, while others refer to it as a G/A polymorphism in the promoter region, thus writing it as, e.g., −1438 G/A or 1438G>A.

, meta-analysis of research studies indicates that people with the A-allele may have slightly elevated risk of schizophrenia.

rs6313, rs6314, and rs7997012 are other investigated SNPs in the HTR2A gene.

References

SNPs on chromosome 13